Lake Murphy  is a freshwater lake in Lake County, Florida, United States. Lake Murphy lies at an elevation of 62 feet (19 m).

References

Lake County Wateratlas: Murphy, Lake

Murphy
Murphy